Ferfolja is a surname. Notable people with the surname include:

Josip Ferfolja (1880–1958), Slovene lawyer and politician
Teja Ferfolja (born 1991), Slovene handball player